Caenocoris nerii, common name oleander seedbug, is a species of ground bugs in the insect family Lygaeidae.

Etymology
The species name nerii refers to the main host plant Nerium oleander.

Distribution
This species is present in part of Europe (Albania, Bulgaria, Cyprus, France, Greece, Italy and Spain), in the Afrotropical realm and in the Indomalayan realm.

Description

The female is larger than the male. Bodies are elongated. The basic color of the body is black, with red markings. Two red quadrangular patches are present on the head. Two red markings appear on the shoulders of pronotum and at the inner margins of the hemielytra, which only partially cover the membranous blackish wings. Scutellum and abdomen are completely red.

Biology

Females usually lay eggs on the leaves of Nerium oleander (hence the common name of the species). All stages of nymphs suck almost exclusively the milky juice of the main host plant (Nerium oleander), but they may also feed on Asclepiadaceae species. Nynphs overwinter. Adults normally feed on the Oleander's fruits and seed. These aposematic bugs are usually rejected by predators because of their toxins derived from the host plant.

References

 Slater, J.A. 1964. A Catalogue of the Lygaeidae of the World. 42-43

External links
 Malta Wild Plants
 Alsphotopage
 Natura Mediterraneo

Lygaeidae
Hemiptera of Europe